The Dominion Lands Act (long title: An Act Respecting the Public Lands of the Dominion) was an 1872 Canadian law that aimed to encourage the settlement of the Canadian Prairies and to help prevent the area being claimed by the United States. The Act was closely based on the U.S. Homestead Act of 1862, setting conditions in which the western lands could be settled and their natural resources developed.

In 1871, the Government of Canada entered into Treaty 1 and Treaty 2 to obtain the consent of the Indigenous nations from the territories set out respectively in each Treaty. The Treaties provided for the taking up of lands "for immigration and settlement". In order to settle the area, Canada invited mass emigration by European and American pioneers, and by settlers from eastern Canada. It echoed the American homestead system by offering ownership of 160 acres of land free (except for a small registration fee) to any man over 18 or any woman heading a household. They did not need to be British subjects, but had to live on the plot and improve it.

Application
Britain had taken possession of lands in western Canada in the form of Rupert's Land, which was then transferred to Canada after Confederation. Canada established the province of Manitoba and the Northwest Territories. Additionally, some land was set aside for the national railway and some land remained under the control of the Hudson's Bay Company, leaving the rest as public lands, to be negotiated with the Indigenous peoples. From 1871 onwards, the Government of Canada negotiated the Numbered Treaties on behalf of the Crown with the First Nations of western Canada to extinguish aboriginal title, establish reserves and establish federal obligations such as education and health care in exchange for lands to settle. Today, there are concerns by the First Nations of western Canada that the Numbered Treaties did not cover all title issues. The First Nations assert they were not only not fairly compensated for their lands, but that only the lands taken up for immigration and settlement were covered in the treaties and that other lands and natural resources were not covered.

Canada passed the Dominion Lands Act in 1872 to encourage settlement. The Act was applied to the province of Manitoba and to the Northwest Territories. Upon the creation of the provinces of Saskatchewan and Alberta from the Northwest Territories, the Act continued to apply to them. It was also extended to the Peace River Block of British Columbia. In 1930, the federal government agreed to transfer control over the public lands and natural resources to the prairie provinces by means of the Natural Resources Acts.  From that point onwards, the Dominion Lands Act only applied in the North-West Territories.

Requirements
The Act gave a claimant  for free, the only cost to the farmer being a $10 administration fee. Any male farmer who was at least 21 years of age and agreed to cultivate at least  of the land and build a permanent dwelling on it (within three years) qualified. This condition of "proving up the homestead" was instituted to prevent speculators from gaining control of the land.

The Act also launched the Dominion Lands Survey, which laid the framework for the layout of the Prairie provinces that continues to this day.

An important difference between the Canadian and U.S. systems was that farmers under the Canadian system could buy a neighboring lot for an additional $10 registration fee, once they had made certain improvements to their original quarter-section. This allowed most farmsteads to quickly double in size, and was especially important in the southern Palliser's Triangle area of the prairies, which was very arid. There it was all but impossible to have a functional farm on only , but it could be managed with 320. Canadian agriculture was consequently more successful than U.S. agriculture in this arid region.

Bloc settlements were encouraged by section 37 which allowed associations of 10 or more settlers to group their houses together to form a settlement to fulfil their cultivation obligations on their own homestead while residing in a hamlet.

Results
The first version of the Act set up extensive exclusion zones. In 1879, the exclusion zone was shrunk to only  from the tracks; and in 1882 it was finally eliminated.

Less than half of the arable land in the West was ever open to farmers for homesteading under the Act. The Hudson's Bay Company, which had once controlled the entire prairies, had kept five percent of the land as part of the terms of the surrender of its charter. Both the railways and Hudson's Bay sold land to land companies and to farmers on the open market. Additional areas were set aside for schools and government buildings.

Repeal of the Act
From 1930 onwards, the Act only applied to the public lands in the Northwest Territories. The homestead provisions of the Act, designed to encourage agricultural settlement on the prairies, had little application to the conditions in the Northwest Territories. Parliament repealed the Act in 1950, replacing it with the Territorial Lands Act, which was better adapted to the conditions in the Territories. The new Act did not contain any homesteading provisions.

See also
 "Last Best West"

Notes

Further reading
 Kirk N. Lambrecht. The Administration of Dominion Lands, 1870-1930 (1991)

External links
Moving Here, Staying Here: The Canadian Immigrant Experience  at Library and Archives Canada

Political history of Canada
Economic history of Canada
Economy of Alberta
Economy of British Columbia
Economy of Manitoba
Economy of Saskatchewan
Economy of the Northwest Territories
Legal history of Canada
1872 in Canadian law
Post-Confederation Canada (1867–1914)
History of immigration to Canada
Canadian federal legislation
Settlement schemes in Canada
Immigration to Manitoba
Immigration to Alberta
Immigration to the Northwest Territories
Immigration to Saskatchewan